Utricularia sect. Vesiculina is a section in the genus Utricularia. The species in this section are small or medium-sized suspended aquatic carnivorous plants native to North and South America.

See also
 List of Utricularia species

References

Utricularia
Plant sections